Triangle fire may refer to:
Triangle Shirtwaist Factory fire, a major fire in Manhattan, New York in 1911.
Freeway Complex Fire, a major wildfire that spread through Orange County in California in 2008.